Endrisone (INN) (brand name Aldrisone), or endrysone (USAN), is a synthetic, steroidal glucocorticoid which is or has been marketed in Italy by . It is used as a topical and ophthalmic anti-inflammatory drug in the treatment of skin and eye conditions, respectively.

See also
 11β-Hydroxyprogesterone
 Medrysone

References

Cyclohexanols
Diketones
Glucocorticoids
Pregnanes
Enones